Chloramines refer to derivatives of ammonia and organic amines wherein one or more N-H bonds have been replaced by N-Cl bonds.  Two classes of compounds are considered: inorganic chloramines and organic chloramines.

Inorganic chloramines
Inorganic chloramines comprise three compounds: monochloramine (NH2Cl), dichloramine (NHCl2), and nitrogen trichloride (NCl3).  Monochloramine is of broad significance as a disinfectant for water.

Organic chloramines

Organic chloramines feature the NCl functional group attached to an organic substituent. Examples include N-chloromorpholine (ClN(CH2CH2)2O), N-chloropiperidine, and N-chloroquinuclidinium chloride.

Chloramines are commonly produced by the action of bleach on secondary amines:
R2NH  +  NaOCl  →  R2NCl  +  NaOH
Tert-butyl hypochlorite can be used instead of bleach:
R2NH  +  t-BuOCl  →  R2NCl  +  t-BuOH

Swimming pools
Chloramines also refers to any chloramine formed by chlorine reacting with ammonia introduced into swimming pools by human perspiration, saliva, mucus, urine, and other biologic substances, and by insects and other pests.  Chloramines are responsible for the "chlorine smell" of pools, as well as skin and eye irritation. These problems are the result of insufficient levels of free available chlorine.

References

Nitrogen halides
Swimming pools